The 1938 Tour of Flanders was held in 1938.

General classification

Final general classification

References
Résultats sur siteducyclisme.net
Résultats sur cyclebase.nl

External links
 

Tour of Flanders
1938 in road cycling
1938 in Belgian sport